Nadia Al-Kokabany is a Yemeni novelist, short story writer and academic. She was born in Taiz and studied architecture at Sanaa University. She completed a PhD in architecture at Cairo University in 2008, before returning to take up an academic position at Sanaa University.

Her first published literary work was a short story in the journal al-Thawra.  Since then, she has published a number of short story collections, starting with Zaferat Al-Yasmeen (Jasmine Sigh) in 2001. Her first novel was titled Hubb laysa illà (Not More than Love) and was published in 2006. It was followed in 2009 by Aqeelat, a story about the lives of 19 Yemeni women. Also in 2009, she formed a literary group called Meeting Yesterday with fellow Yemeni authors Ali al-Moqri, Samir Abdul-Fatah and Wajdi al-Ahdal.

Al-Kokabany has received a number of literary awards both in Yemen and abroad. Among these are the Suad al-Sabah Prize in 2000 (second prize), the Yemeni President's Award for Young Writers (2001) and the Arab Fund for Arts and Culture Grant (2010). In 2009, she was invited to participate in the first writers' workshop (nadwa) organised by IPAF, and her work was included in the resulting anthology entitled Emerging Arab Voices. Her work has appeared in translation in two issues of Banipal magazine, in 2005 and in 2009. She has also been translated into French and German.

Al-Kokabany is married with three children.

References

External links
 Author's website in Arabic (with English biography)

Living people
Yemeni women novelists
People from Taiz
Sanaa University alumni
Cairo University alumni
Academic staff of Sanaa University
21st-century Yemeni women writers
21st-century Yemeni writers
Year of birth missing (living people)